Welsbach is a surname. Notable people with the surname include:

 Alois Auer Ritter von Welsbach(an inventor/polymath)
 Carl Auer von Welsbach(a scientist and inventor)